Dwivedula Visalakshi (1929 – 7 November 2014), was a well-known Telugu writer. Hailing from Vizianagaram, the cultural capital of Andhra Pradesh, she distinguished herself as a writer of short stories and novels. Her lucid style adorned all her novels from Vaikuntapaali, Vaaradhi to Enta Dooram Ee Payanam. The novel Vaaradhi has even been a hit on silver screen. She received the D.Litt. Degree from the Potti Sreeramulu Telugu University, Hyderabad in 1998.

She wrote many books and short stories.

She was the recipient of Sri Raja-Lakshmi Foundation Literary Award in 1999.

She donated the rights on her books to Dt. Gen Library (Poura Grandhalayam Dwarakanagar, Visakhapatnam, in the presence of Dr. D. V. Subba Rao Ex-Mayar, Shri Bhamidipati Ramagopalam garu etc.).

Literary works 

Vaikuntapaali (1963)
Ee Payanam Chatiki
Yekkavalasina Railu
Vaaradhi
Enta Dooram Ee Payanam
Reati Velugu
Grahanam Vidichindi
Maarina Viluvalu
Jaarudu Metlu

References

External links
Picture:-Inauguration of the film "Vasthade Maa Baava" (Ghantasala last film as a music director) - GH, Devulapalli Krishna Shastry, Dwivedula Visalakshi and the producer T.Gopala Krishna. 

1929 births
2014 deaths
Telugu writers
Women writers from Andhra Pradesh
People from Vizianagaram
20th-century Indian short story writers
Indian women short story writers
20th-century Indian novelists
Indian women novelists
20th-century Indian women writers
Novelists from Andhra Pradesh
Telugu women writers